Àlex Corretja was the defending champion, but was forced to withdraw at his first round match against tournament runner-up Nicolás Lapentti.

Albert Costa won the title by defeating Nicolás Lapentti 7–6(7–4), 6–3, 6–4 in the final.

Seeds

Draw

Finals

Top half

Bottom half

References

External links
 Official results archive (ATP)
 Official results archive (ITF)

Rado Swiss Open Gstaad - Singles
1999 Singles